I Can See Your Voice Malaysia is a Malaysian Malay-language television mystery music game show series based on the South Korean programme of the same name. Since its premiere on 4 August 2018, it has aired five seasons on two different networks — NTV7 (in 2018) and TV3 (from 2019 to 2022).

Gameplay

Format
Presented with a group of six "mystery singers" identified only by their occupation, a guest artist must attempt to eliminate bad singers from the group without ever hearing them sing, assisted by clues and a celebrity panel over the course of three rounds. At the end of the game, the last remaining mystery singer is revealed as either good or bad by means of a duet between them and one of the guest artists.

Rewards
The winning mystery singer is awarded on the following conditions:
If the singer is good, he/she will have chance to get a potential contract and a single under Monkey Bone Records and Warner Music Malaysia. Until the second season, he/she will perform again in the post-season encore concert episode.
If the singer is bad, he/she wins  until the fourth season, and then  since the fifth season.

Rounds
Each episode presents the guest artist with six people whose identities and singing voices are kept concealed until they are eliminated to perform on the "stage of truth" or remain in the end to perform the final duet.

Notes:

Production

Background and development
Media Prima Berhad first announced the development of the series in June 2018. It is produced by Primeworks Studios; the staff team is managed by executive producer Mas Ayu Binti Ali and director Lucent Chong.

Filming
Tapings for the programme took place at Sri Pentas Studios, based at Plaza Alam Sentral in Shah Alam.

Since from third to fifth season, the programme was filmed under health and safety protocols due to the COVID-19 pandemic.

Broadcast

History
I Can See Your Voice Malaysia debuted on 4 August 2018. Following the first season broadcasts on NTV7, the show made its transition to TV3 that started the second season on 23 June 2019. For the third season, the first part premiered on 16 February 2020, continuing with the second part on 21 June 2020. Regular episodes have started for the fourth season on 23 May 2021, and the fifth season that has been already renewed after the finale of preceding one on 15 May 2022. An upcoming sixth season is scheduled to premiere in 2023.

Special episodes and companion events

The first two seasons held its postseason showcase as Encore Concert, featuring some of mystery singers returned to perform one last time. Since the third season, it was then replaced by Online Concert, a digital companion event held after the season finale.

Cast
The series employs a team of "celebrity panelists" who decipher mystery singers' evidences throughout the game. Alongside with full-timers and additional ones, guest panelists also appear since the first season. Throughout its broadcast, the programme has assigned 9 different panelists.

Series overview

References 

 
2010s Malaysian television series
2020s Malaysian television series
2018 Malaysian television series debuts
Malaysian game shows
Malaysian television series based on South Korean television series
NTV7 original programming
TV3 (Malaysia) original programming